SLNS Parakrama is a Sri Lanka Navy shore establishment sited on Flagstaff Street in Colombo, in close proximity to the Colombo Lighthouse. It functions as the naval headquarters of the Navy. In this capacity it has the offices of the Commander of the Navy, Chief of Staff, the Board of Management (BOM) and Board of Directors (BOD) of the Sri Lanka Navy. All naval operations are directed from SLNS Parakrama. The base was formerly known as HMCyS Parakrama prior to 1972 and traces it establishment to HMS Lanka, the Royal Navy barracks in Colombo.

See also 
 HMS Gamunu

External links
 Sailing the rough seas 
 CofN participates in Oath Taking Ceremony at SLNS Parakrama on 2006_01_01 

Installations of the Sri Lanka Navy
Government buildings in Colombo
Military units and formations of the United Kingdom in World War II
Military units and formations of Ceylon in World War II
World War II sites in Sri Lanka